Ville-le-Marclet is a commune in the Somme department in Hauts-de-France in northern France.

Geography
The commune is situated 24 km (15 miles) northwest of Amiens, on the D159 road and 1 mile(1.6 km) from a junction with the A16 autoroute.

Population

See also
Communes of the Somme department

References

Communes of Somme (department)